Zerynthia rumina, the Spanish festoon, is a butterfly belonging to the family Papilionidae. It is a widespread species in Iberia and frequents most habitats.

Distribution 
North Africa, the Iberian Peninsula and southern France.

Description 
Zerynthia rumina is an extremely striking species. In south east France it can be confused with the southern festoon (Zerynthia polyxena). The two can be told apart by the presence of blue on the hindwing of the southern festoon. The Spanish festoon also has extensive red on the forewings.

Flight period 
The flight period is generally in April and May with the possibility of a very small second brood in September.

Synonymy
This species represents an extreme example of oversplitting.

rumina Linnaeus (=andalusica Ribbe 1910) (south Spain: Andalusia).
form tristis Verity
form semitristis de Sagorra, 1930
form xanthe Schultz, 1908 (mackeri Holland, 1910)
form rubistriga Bryk
form honorathii Boisduval, 1832
form ochracea Staudinger, 1861
form medicaste Illiger
form andalusica Ribbe, 1910
form paucipunctata Neuburger
form minusculus Eisner
form lusitanica Bryk, 1932 (Portugal:Lissabon, Algarve, Cintra, Belem, Oporto, Leca)
form semitristis de Sagarra, 1930
form paucipunctata Neuburger
form ornatissima Blachier, 1908
form nigricans Eisner
form minusculus Eisner
form aperta Eisner
form divisa Schultz, 1908
form canteneri Staudinger, 1861
ornatior Blachier, 1905 = africana (Stichel, 1907), = mauretanica Schultz, 1908 (Northern Africa: Algeria, Morocco: Tangier). The name ornatior is not the correct one for the northern African representative. canteneri (Heydenrich i.l.) Staudinger, 1861 (= canteneri Heyd. 1851, was originally applied to African populations and is the valid name, c.f. Cajetan Felder and Rudolf Felder (1864), Rothschild (1917), canteneri is generally considered a European form but the type locality was fixed 'Algeria' by Cajetan and Rudolf Felder (l.c.) whereas Staudinger (1861) only, and apparently erroneously, referred the name to the Iberian form ochracea. Manley and Allcard (1970) following Bryk (1934) referred to canteneri Staudinger as an orange aberration of both sexes which is frequent in Morocco but occasionally appears in warmer parts of south Spain.
form irregularis Holland, 1912
form distorta Rothschild, 1918
form ornatissima Blachier, 1908
form nebulosa Holland, 1912
form xanthe Schultze, 1908
form honorathii Boisduval, 1832
form poujadei Thierry-Meg, 1910
form canteneri Staudinger, 1861
form nigricans Holland, 1912
form minusculus Eisner
form posteriorrubromarginalis Eisner
form paucipunctata Neuburger

References 
 Gil-T., F., 2008: The form canteneri Staudinger of Zerynthia rumina L., an interesting case of sex-linked inheritance: a study of its occurrence in captive-bred specimens and notes about other forms and aberrations (Lepidoptera: Papilionidae). ISSN 0171-0079 | Atalanta 39 (1/4): 337-342, 421. Full article: .

External links
 
 TOL
 Zerynthia rumina on Guy Padfield's Butterfly Page
 Globis Gart

Rumina
Butterflies described in 1758
Taxa named by Carl Linnaeus
Butterflies of Europe